The Scottish National Investment Bank Act 2020 is an Act of the Scottish Parliament which was passed by Parliament on 21 January 2020. The Act legally obliges Scottish Ministers to establish a National Investment Bank for Scotland as both a public body and a publicly limited company. The bank is to be independent of the Scottish Government. "Its primary goal is to help Scotland transition to net-zero carbon emissions, while supporting small and medium-size enterprises."

The Bill was introduced by Cabinet Secretary for Finance, Derek Mackay MSP.

The lead scrutinising committee was the Finance and Constitution Committee.

The Bill received Royal assent on 25 February 2020, becoming an Act of the Scottish Parliament.
 
The Scottish National Investment Bank was formally launched in November 2020.

References

Acts of the Scottish Parliament 2020